{{DISPLAYTITLE:C3 Centauri}}

C3 Centauri is a suspected astrometric binary star system in the southern constellation of Centaurus. It has an orange hue and is dimly visible to the naked eye with an apparent visual magnitude of +5.46. The distance to this object is approximately 342 light years based on parallax. It is a member of the Hyades Stream of co-moving stars.

The visible component of this system is an aging giant star with a stellar classification of K2 III, which indicates it has exhausted the supply of hydrogen at its core then cooled and expanded off the main sequence. At present it has nearly sixteen times the girth of the Sun. It is radiating 96 times the luminosity of the Sun from its swollen photosphere at an effective temperature of 4,535 K.

References 

K-type giants
Hyades Stream
Astrometric binaries

Centaurus (constellation)
Centauri, C3
CD-47 06997
101067
056700
4476